The Gotham Independent Film Award for Outstanding Lead Performance is one of the annual Gotham Independent Film Awards and was first awarded in 2021. 

It is a gender neutral award and was introduced for the Gotham Independent Film Awards 2021 to replace the awards for Best Actor and Best Actress given out in previous years.

Winners and nominees

2020s

See also
 Independent Spirit Award for Best Male Lead
 Independent Spirit Award for Best Female Lead

References

Outstanding Lead Performance
Film awards for lead actor
Film awards for lead actress
Awards established in 2021